Hamburg-Eimsbütteler Ballspiel-Club is a German sports club in Eimsbüttel, Hamburg, Germany. The club is also known as HEBC Hamburg, HEBC and Hamburg-Eimsbütteler BC.

History 

The club was founded in 1911 as SC Eibe. The club merged three times over ten years. First, they merged with Harvestehuder FC in 1912 to form Hamburger BC 1911. They had a failed merger with SC Hansa 1911 in 1919 then merged with Eimsbütteler SC in 1921 to form Hamburg-Eimsbütteler BC. They then merged with Sport 01 Hamburg during World War II but re-formed as Hamburg-Eimsbütteler Ballspiel-Club after. During these years, they were mostly in the second division of the Fußball-Bezirksklasse Groß-Hamburg (Football district class Greater Hamburg).

The club played in the 1. Klasse Hamburg from 1945 to 1947, which was the second highest class of West German football. They were relegated in 1949 and had dropped down to the fourth division by 1951. The club made it back to the third division from 1954 to 1957 then made it to the second division until demotion in 1960. With the creation of the Bundesliga in 1963, they remained in the third division. The team made it to the finals of the Hamburg Cup in 1982–83 but were defeated by Hummelsbütteler SV in the penalty kick shootout.

The team struggled in the decades after, often staying in the sixth division in the 1990s and 2000s. They were demoted to the 7th division in 2011, before eventually making it back to the fifth division in 2017–18, where they play today.

Honors 

Fußball-Bezirksklasse Groß-Hamburg
Champions: 1942–43Verbandsliga Hamburg-Germania'''
Champions: 1956–57

Notable players and staff 

 Horst Haecks - Played for the club as a youth player and later played for FC St. Pauli.
 Aferdita Kameraj - Played for the club as a youth player. She later played in the Frauen-Bundesliga for  Hamburger SV.
 Jörn Großkopf - He played in the Bundesliga for FC St. Pauli and later coached HEBC Hamburg from 2018 to 2019. 
 David Philipp - Played for the club as a youth player and later played for the  German national youth football team.
 Thomas Wolter - Played for the club from 1979 to 1984 and made an appearance for the Germany national football team.
 Daniel Brückner - Played for the club from 2001 to 2004 and later played for SC Paderborn 07 in the Bundesliga.
 Burghard Rylewicz - He played for the club as a youth player and later played in the first division for VfB Oldenburg and Borussia Dortmund.
 Heinrich Kokartis - He played for the club as a youth player and later played for Werder Bremen.
 André Trulsen - He played for the club as a youth player and later played for FC St. Pauli and 1. FC Köln. He was later voted in as one of the best players in FC St. Pauli's history.

References

External links 
Official Website

1911 establishments in Germany
Association football clubs established in 1911
Football clubs in Hamburg
Football clubs in Germany
Hamburg